Jose Apolinario "Jun" L. Lozada Jr. (August 17, 1950 – July 31, 2018) was a Filipino diplomat and politician.

Biography 
He was born in Quezon City. Lozada studied mathematics at De La Salle University. He earned two master's degrees, in physics and public administration, at Silliman University and the University of the Philippines, respectively. Lozada was Philippine ambassador to the Vatican, Austria, and Palau, before serving as adviser and secretary to Fidel Ramos between 1992 and 1998. Lozada was elected to the House of Representatives from Negros Occidental fifth district for the first time in 1998, and won reelection in 2001. He was allied with Lakas–CMD. Over the course of his legislative tenure, Lozada led the House committee of foreign affairs, authored the Dual Citizenship Act, and helped pass the Overseas Absentee Voting Law. Lozada also authored and filed a bill in March 1999 seeking the establishment of a Pasig River Development Office to better solve the pollution problem of the Pasig River. In 2010, Lozada launched an unsuccessful campaign for a Senate seat, representing Pwersa ng Masang Pilipino.

He was diagnosed with prostate cancer in 2014. After treatment, the cancer went into remission the next year. Lozada died of a brain hemorrhage on July 31, 2018, at the National Kidney and Transplant Institute in Quezon City.

References

1950 births
2018 deaths
De La Salle University alumni
Silliman University alumni
University of the Philippines alumni
Members of the House of Representatives of the Philippines from Negros Occidental
Pwersa ng Masang Pilipino politicians
Ambassadors of the Philippines to Austria
Ambassadors of the Philippines to the Holy See
Lakas–CMD (1991) politicians
Ambassadors of the Philippines to Palau
People from Quezon City